Abu Jahal Tratter (born January 9, 1993) is a Filipino-American professional basketball player for the Converge FiberXers of the Philippine Basketball Association (PBA). He played college basketball for the De La Salle University.

Professional career
Tratter was selected seventh overall during the 2018 PBA draft by the Blackwater Elite.

On September 6, 2019, he was traded to the Alaska Aces for Carl Bryan Cruz.

On June 15, 2022, he signed a contract with the Converge FiberXers, the new team that took over the defunct Alaska Aces franchise.

PBA career statistics

As of the end of 2022–23 season

Season-by-season averages

|-
| align=left rowspan=2| 
| align=left | Blackwater
| rowspan=2|32 || rowspan=2|21.1 || rowspan=2|.476 || rowspan=2|.000 || rowspan=2|.535 || rowspan=2|5.2 || rowspan=2|.6 || rowspan=2|.8 || rowspan=2|.2 || rowspan=2|8.7
|-
| align=left | Alaska
|-
| align=left | 
| align=left | Alaska
| 12 || 27.5 || .544 || – || .630 || 6.5 || .4 || .7 || .2 || 12.5
|-
| align=left | 
| align=left | Alaska
| 24 || 29.0 || .431 || .000 || .685 || 6.7 || 1.4  || .5 || .4 || 10.9
|-
| align=left | 
| align=left | Converge
| 33 || 21.7 || .440 || .281 || .678 || 5.0 || .7  || .6 || .4 || 7.6
|-class=sortbottom
| align="center" colspan=2 | Career
| 101 || 23.9 || .461 || .214 || .2 || 5.7 || .8 || .6 || .3 || 9.0

References

1993 births
Living people
21st-century African-American sportspeople
Alaska Aces (PBA) players
African-American basketball players
American men's basketball players
Basketball players from Laguna (province)
Blackwater Bossing players
Centers (basketball)
De La Salle Green Archers basketball players
Filipino men's basketball players
Filipino people of African-American descent
NLEX Road Warriors draft picks
Philippines men's national basketball team players
Power forwards (basketball)
Converge FiberXers players